Karan Nande (born 7 January 1987) is an Indian cricketer. He made his List A debut for Chilaw Marians Cricket Club in the 2018–19 Premier Limited Overs Tournament on 4 March 2019. He made his first-class debut on 14 February 2020, for Sebastianites Cricket and Athletic Club in Tier B of the 2019–20 Premier League Tournament.

References

External links
 

1987 births
Living people
Indian cricketers
Chilaw Marians Cricket Club cricketers
Maharashtra cricketers
Sebastianites Cricket and Athletic Club cricketers
Place of birth missing (living people)